Geological Survey Ireland or Geological Survey of Ireland, founded in 1845, is the National Earth Science agency of Ireland.

Overview
Geological Survey Ireland is a division of the Department of Communications, Climate Action and Environment and is based in Beggars Bush Barracks in Dublin. Its multidisciplinary staff work in sections such as groundwater, bedrock mapping (consisting of bedrock and quaternary/geotechnical), information management, heritage, marine and minerals. It is responsible for providing geological advice and information, and for the acquisition of data for this purpose. Geological Survey Ireland produces maps, reports and databases, and acts as a knowledge centre and project partner in a number of aspects of Irish geology.

The organisation managed the Irish National Seabed Survey (INSS, 1999–2005), which on completion was the world's largest civilian marine mapping programme. The INSS mapped all of Ireland's waters over 200 m deep, principally in support of territorial claim, and covering over 600,000 km2. Since 2006, Geological Survey Ireland has managed the successor programme INFOMAR (Integrated Mapping for the Sustainable Development of Ireland's Marine Resources), which is completing the mapping of all Irish waters. INFOMAR is funded by the Geological Survey Ireland parent department and undertaken in conjunction with the Marine Institute Ireland.

GSI and the Dublin Institute for Advanced Studies operate the Irish National Seismic Network together.

References

External links
 Geological Survey Ireland
Geological Survey Maps Collection. Over 200 maps of Ireland 1859-1913. A UCD Digital Library Collection.

Ireland
Ireland
Ireland